Lu Yen-hsun (born 14 August 1983) is a Taiwanese retired tennis player, who goes by the nickname Rendy Lu.
He won the most titles on the ATP Challenger Tour in tennis history. His favorite surface is hardcourt, though several of his ATP Tour career highlights came on grass, including reaching the quarterfinals of the 2010 Wimbledon Championships.

Juniors
Lu was an accomplished junior player, reaching as high as No. 3 in the ITF junior singles rankings in February 2001 (and No. 9 in doubles). In his junior career, he compiled a singles win–loss record of 80–37 (63–34 in doubles) and defeated a handful of future ATP stars, including Robin Söderling, Mario Ančić, and Philipp Kohlschreiber.

His result in Junior Grand Slam events are as follows:
 Australian Open: 1R (2001)
 French Open: 1R (2000)
 Wimbledon: 1R (2000) 
 US Open: 2R (2000)

Tennis career
In 2004, Lu became the first player from Taiwan to break into ATP top 100, thanks to a solid performance in the Challenger Tour in the first half of 2004. He started to participate in many tour-level events. Although he suffered many defeats, his effort yielded some good wins. The most notable win came on the grass court in the Queen's Club Championships, where he gained his first top-10 win by defeating then world No. 3, Guillermo Coria.

A series of injuries caused his ranking to fall rapidly in 2005. He did not participate in any tournaments after withdrawing in the second round in Ho Chi Minh City.

2006–2007
Returning to the circuit, Lu enjoyed a solid performance throughout the season, and a late surge at the end of the season, advancing to semifinals or better in four consecutive Challengers (Rimouski, Busan, Caloundra, and Kawana). He lost in the final of Rimouski to his friend Kristian Pless. Two weeks later, Lu won the Caloundra Challenger, beating Peter Luczak. The following week, he lost in the final to Julien Jeanpierre. Lu's hot streak moved him from No. 140 in the ATP in October to No. 89 at year-end.

In winter 2006, Lu was training with Rainer Schüttler and Janko Tipsarević in Dubai, under Dirk Hordorff. The training seems to yield good results, as Lu reached second round at Australian Open and his first ATP level quarterfinal in Memphis in 2007. By defeating Jürgen Melzer in second round, Lu entered his first ATP level quarterfinal, but lost to eventual finalist Andy Roddick. With the strong performance in Memphis, Lu broke into top 80 in February.

2008

In 2008, Lu did well on the Challenger Iour, taking home titles in Waikoloa, New Delhi and Tashkent, while reaching the finals of three other Challenger events. On the ATP Tour, Lu booked a spot in the quarterfinals in San Jose by defeating Max Mirnyi in the first round and Wayne Odesnik in straight sets in the second round. He then lost to Radek Štěpánek in the quarterfinals in two sets.

Perhaps Lu's best performance during the season came at the Beijing Olympics, representing Chinese Taipei. Lu shocked audiences by defeating then sixth ranked player in the world, Andy Murray, in straight sets in the first round. Lu continued his winning streak at the Olympics by defeating Agustín Calleri of Argentina to advance to the third round (round of 16), but eventually lost to Jürgen Melzer of Austria.

2009
At the 2009 Australian Open, Lu advanced to the third round of a Grand Slam tournament for the first time, defeating 10th seeded David Nalbandian in five sets in the second round. He lost to Tommy Robredo in the third round.

Lu, ranked 82, defeated former world No. 1, Lleyton Hewitt, in the first round of Delray Beach International Tennis Championships. He then lost to Stefan Koubek.

In May 2009, Lu won the $100k Israel Open at Ramat HaSharon, beating German Benjamin Becker, who was forced to retire.

Lu retired in his first-round match against Mathieu Montcourt at Roland Garros, trailing 2–6.

He was defeated by Roger Federer in the first round of Wimbledon in three sets.

In November 2009, Lu won the $100k Flea Market Cup at Chuncheon, beating Dutch player Igor Sijsling.

2010
At Wimbledon, Lu became the first Taiwanese player to reach the quarterfinals of a Grand Slam championship, and the first man from Asia to reach the quarterfinals at a major in 15 years. He made it to the fourth round without dropping a set defeating Horacio Zeballos, Michał Przysiężny, and Florian Mayer, with Mayer withdrawing in the third set. The unseeded Lu achieved the biggest of the upsets on "Manic Monday" by beating world No. 5, Andy Roddick (who was ranked 77 places higher than Lu), in 4 hours and 36 mins with the fifth set going to 9–7. He lost to No. 3 seed Novak Djokovic but moved up 40 places to 42nd in the ATP after Wimbledon. The ATP named Lu's fourth-round Wimbledon upset against Roddick as the biggest upset of 2010. At the beginning of November, Lu reached a career-high ATP ranking of 33.

2011–2013

At the 2011 Farmers Classic, Lu defeated Robby Ginepri in the first round. He then defeated Marcos Baghdatis before losing to Ryan Harrison in the quarterfinals. At the Odlum Brown Vancouver Open as the number one seeded player, defeating George Bastl in the first round before losing to Alex Bogdanovic. At the Rogers Cup, Lu lost to Bernard Tomic in the first round.

On 15 June 2012, Lu clinched a huge maiden victory with a third set tiebreak triumph over third seed Janko Tipsarević to reach the quarterfinals at Queen's Club.

Lu lost in the second round in all Grand Slam events held in 2013.

2014–2015
On 10 January 2014, Lu made his maiden ATP final in Auckland against John Isner by defeating David Ferrer in the semifinals. He lost in the final 6–7, 6–7. During the 2014 Asian Games, the ATP threatened to fine and ban Lu for three years if he did not report to the China Open on September 29. He had signed up to participate in both events, but the final for the Asian Games did not take place until September 30, a schedule conflict the ATP would not accommodate. In response, Lu dropped out of the China Open. The ATP then announced that Lu would be fined, but not banned.

In 2015, Lu won his third doubles tournament with Jonathan Marray, at the Chennai Open. Lu also reached a career milestone by becoming only the second player in history to reach 300 career Challenger wins behind Ruben Ramirez Hidalgo.

2016–2020
In 2016, Lu reached the finals of six more challenger events winning four. His best ATP Tour performance of the year was a quarterfinal appearance at the 2016 Winston-Salem Open.

On August 12, 2017, Lu won his 37th and last challenger singles title against Ričardas Berankis. Lu would end his career with a combined 56 Challenger titles between the singles and doubles. He holds the record for the most singles Challenger titles and the most combined singles and doubles Challenger titles.

In 2018, Lu underwent shoulder surgery which kept him out of play for most of the 2018 season and all of the 2019 season. Lu officially came back at the 2020 Australian Open where he gained a protected ranking in the main draw. He lost to Gaël Monfils in the first round in straight sets.

2021
At the Miami Open, Lu recorded his last ATP match win against Sam Querrey. He would then lose in the next round to world No. 2, Daniil Medvedev.

In June 2021, after playing a few more ATP matches, Lu announced that he would retire from tennis and that the 2021 Wimbledon Championships and the 2021 Tokyo Olympics would be his last tournaments on the tour. 

At the Tokyo Olympics, he was one of the two official flag bearers for Taiwan (Chinese Taipei) at the opening ceremony.

On July 25, 2021, Lu played his last career tennis match at the Olympics against Alexander Zverev where he lost in straight sets. With this appearance, he became one of 6 male tennis players with 5 or more appearances at the Olympics, and is the only male tennis player to compete in Singles at 5 Olympics.

ATP career finals

Singles: 1 (runner-up)

Doubles: 6 (3–3)

ATP Challenger and ITF Futures finals

Singles: 56 (37–19)

Doubles: 31 (19–12)

Performance timelines

Singles

1 At the 2013 French Open, Lu withdrew prior to the second round.
2 Held as Hamburg Masters until 2008, Madrid Masters (clay) 2009 – present.

Doubles

Wins over top 10 players
Yen-hsun has a  record against players who were, at the time the match was played, ranked in the top 10.

Equipment
Lu was sponsored by adidas (apparel and shoes), Head (rackets), Chunghwa Telecom and CPC Corporation. On court, Lu used a Head IG Extreme Pro racket, Signum Poly Pro strings, and a Tournagrip overgrip.

See also
 Sport in Taiwan
 List of flag bearers for Chinese Taipei at the Olympics

References

External links
 
 
 
 Official website
 Yen-hsun recent match results
 Yen-hsun world ranking history

1983 births
Living people
Olympic tennis players of Taiwan
Sportspeople from Taoyuan City
Taiwanese male tennis players
Tennis players at the 2004 Summer Olympics
Tennis players at the 2008 Summer Olympics
Tennis players at the 2012 Summer Olympics
Tennis players at the 2016 Summer Olympics
Tennis players at the 2020 Summer Olympics
Tennis players at the 2002 Asian Games
Tennis players at the 2006 Asian Games
Tennis players at the 2010 Asian Games
Tennis players at the 2014 Asian Games
Asian Games medalists in tennis
Asian Games gold medalists for Chinese Taipei
Asian Games silver medalists for Chinese Taipei
Asian Games bronze medalists for Chinese Taipei
Medalists at the 2002 Asian Games
Medalists at the 2006 Asian Games
Medalists at the 2010 Asian Games
Medalists at the 2014 Asian Games
Universiade medalists in tennis
Universiade gold medalists for Chinese Taipei
Universiade bronze medalists for Chinese Taipei
Medalists at the 2001 Summer Universiade
Medalists at the 2003 Summer Universiade
Hopman Cup competitors